"Break Your Heart" is a 1998 single by American alternative singer-songwriter Natalie Merchant, featuring N'Dea Davenport. The song was the second single from Merchant's 1998 album, Ophelia.
 
"Break Your Heart" sings about the saddening social injustices of the world and human nature. Merchant sings that "I know that it will hurt/I know that it will break your heart/The way things are/The way they've been/And the way they'll always be".

Chart performance

"Break Your Heart" spent 16 weeks on the Billboard Adult Top 40 chart, peaking at No. 24 on January 2, 1999.

References

Natalie Merchant songs
1998 songs
1998 singles
Songs written by Natalie Merchant
Elektra Records singles